The following are the national records in Olympic weightlifting in Ireland. Records are maintained in each weight class for the snatch lift, clean and jerk lift, and the total for both lifts by the Irish Amateur Weightlifting Association  (IAWLA).

Current records

Men

Women

Historical records

Men (1998–2018)

Women (1998–2018)

References
General
Irish records 31 December 2022 udpated
Specific

External links
IAWLA web site

records
Ireland
Olympic weightlifting
weightlifting